Glendorado is an unincorporated community in Glendorado Township, Benton County, Minnesota, United States.  The community is located near the junction of Benton County Roads 9 and 87, Glendorado Road.  State Highway 95 (MN 95) is also in the immediate area.  Nearby places include Foley, Princeton, and Santiago.

References

Unincorporated communities in Benton County, Minnesota
Unincorporated communities in Minnesota